Farisabad (also Romanized as Farīsābād; also known as Farasābād, Farsābād, and Paresābād) is a village in Khosrow Beyk Rural District, Milajerd District, Komijan County, Markazi Province, Iran. At the 2006 census, its population was 77, in 18 families.

References 

Populated places in Komijan County